Gymnogramma hollandi is a moth of the Lacturidae family. It is only known from the Republic of the Congo.

Antennae has a length of two-thirds of the forewings, basal joint enlarged, in the male biciliate. The forewings are stone grey. The forewings' expanse is 22–25 mm.

The type was provided from the Republic of the Congo, valley of the Ogooué River, Kangwé.

References

Walsingham, 1897: Pl.2, fig.8

Endemic fauna of the Republic of the Congo
Zygaenoidea
Moths of Africa
Moths described in 1897